Jason T. Wiltz (born November 23, 1976) is a former American football defensive lineman who played two seasons with the New York Jets of the National Football League. He was drafted by the New York Jets in the fourth round of the 1999 NFL Draft. He played college football at the University of Nebraska–Lincoln and attended St. Augustine High School in New Orleans, Louisiana. Wiltz was also a member of the Chicago Bears.

Professional career

New York Jets
Wiltz was drafted by the New York Jets with the 123rd pick in the 1999 NFL Draft. As a rookie, he had an interception in two straight games. He was released by the Jets on September 2, 2001.

Chicago Bears
Wiltz signed with the Chicago Bears on March 22, 2002. He was released by the Bears on September 1, 2002.

References

External links
Just Sports Stats

Living people
1976 births
St. Augustine High School (New Orleans) alumni
Players of American football from New Orleans
American football defensive linemen
African-American players of American football
Nebraska Cornhuskers football players
New York Jets players
Chicago Bears players
21st-century African-American sportspeople
20th-century African-American sportspeople